James Dunlop (1793–1848) was a Scottish astronomer.

James Dunlop may also refer to:
Jim Dunlop Sr, founder of Dunlop Manufacturing
James Dunlop (judge) (1793–1872), United States federal judge
James Dunlop (astronomer), Scottish astronomer and academic
James Dunlop of Dunlop (1759–1832), Scottish Laird, British Army officer, MP for Kirkcudbright Stewartry 1812–26
James Dunlop (footballer) (1870–1892), Scottish footballer (St Mirren and Scotland)
James Dunlop (rugby union) (1854–1923), Scotland rugby union player
Sir James Dunlop, 2nd Baronet (1830–1858), of the Dunlop baronets

See also

Dunlop (surname)